The Colombian Paralympic Committee (CPC;  – CPC) is a private, non-profit organization representing the Colombian Paralympic athletes in the International Paralympic Committee (IPC), the Parapan American Games and the South American Para Games. It's the governing body of the Colombian Paralympic sport; it represents 15 member sports organizations.

Mission 
The Colombian Paralympic Committee is the entity that promotes the formulation and implementation of the public policy of sport recreation, and sports rehabilitation within the Colombian Paralympic System. In addition, it coordinates and executes the different programs of the Paralympic and Deaflympic sport in the Colombian territory in conjunction with its national federations and competent international entities.

This organizational structure defines a dimension in the aspect of the projections in its organizational processes, established in its programmatic vision.

Objectives

General Objective 
Achieve the strengthening and consolidation of the Colombian Paralympic Committee, making visible the disability situation in the national and international sports, recreation and leisure time of people with disabilities.

Specific Objectives 
 Position the Colombian Paralympic Committee as the governing body for the sport of persons with disabilities in all national and international instances.

 Consolidate the internal management structures of the Colombian Paralympic Committee with an effectiveness approach.

 Build the policies, guidelines and guidelines to ensure the proper functioning of the National Paralympic System in harmony with the International System.

 To propitiate conditions for the development of the Paralympic and Deaflympic sports practice in Colombia.

 Strengthen the structures of the Paralympic System through processes of cultural transformation, sports development from the base and sports projection, in line with the new world trends in sport.

 Build and apply a comprehensive policy of communication, education, dissemination and dissemination of the Colombian Paralympic culture.

 Promote in the Colombian social imaginary, the gradual actions of transformation of practices oriented to the use of free time, recreation and sport of people with disabilities, in all its manifestations, to guarantee real and effective access to these activities.

 Establish the necessary strategic alliances with public and private organizations and civil society organizations, within the different social, political, economic and cultural sectors, to contribute to the objectives of the Plan.

 Promote transversal actions that facilitate the production and the development of new knowledge about the Colombian Paralympic System.

Associated Federations

International events 
The CPC represents and coordinates the participation of Colombian athletes in the maximum Paralympic tournaments:

 Paralympic Games
 Parapan American Games
 South American Para Games

See also
Colombia at the Paralympics
Colombian Olympic Committee

References

External links
Official website

National Paralympic Committees
Paralympic
Colombia at the Paralympics
Sports organizations established in 2001
2001 establishments in Colombia